Øverbygd is a former municipality in Troms county in Norway.  The  municipality existed from 1925 until its dissolution in 1964.  It was located in what is now the eastern part of Målselv Municipality, stretching from the border with Sweden in the east, through the Dividalen and Rostadalen valleys to the Målselva river and the eastern part of the Målselvdalen valley.  The administrative centre was the village of Skjold.  Skjold was the site of the local church, Øverbygd Church as well as home to a large garrison for the Norwegian Army.  Øvre Dividal National Park made up a large part of the southeastern part of the municipality.

History
The municipality of Øverbygd was established on 1 July 1925 when Målselv Municipality was divided into two municipalities:  Målselv in the west and Øverbygd in the east. Initially, Øverbygd had a population of 566 inhabitants.  

During the 1960s, there were many municipal mergers across Norway due to the work of the Schei Committee. On 1 January 1964, Øverbygd municipality (population: 1,232) was merged with all of the municipality of Målselv (population: 5,584), the Naveren and Målsnes areas of Malangen municipality (population: 118), and the Skogli ved Heia farm (population: 2) from Balsfjord municipality to form a new, larger Målselv Municipality. Dividalen is used as a setting in TV drama Outlier (2020).

World War II
During World War II, the German army created a military base at Øverbygd. The base was initially a supply point for the German forces attack on Murmansk. German soldiers on retreat at the end of the war came through Øverbygd. Maukstadmoen and Holmen were undeveloped pine forests, but virtually all of the commercial forest was cut down to provide German troops land and building materials.

Large barracks for the officer's quarters were established on Maukstadmoen. They also built large stock barracks, a cold storage plant, and a German military hospital. A Prisoner-of-war camp for Russian prisoners of war and medical camp was built near Holmen.

Government

Municipal council
The municipal council  of Øverbygd was made up of 13 representatives that were elected to four year terms.  The party breakdown of the final municipal council was as follows:

References

External links

Målselv
Populated places of Arctic Norway
Former municipalities of Norway
1925 establishments in Norway
1964 disestablishments in Norway